Clark Johnson (born September 10, 1954), is an American-Canadian actor and director who has worked in both television and film. He is best known for his roles as David Jefferson in Night Heat (1985–1988), Clark Roberts in E.N.G. (1989–1994), Meldrick Lewis in Homicide: Life on the Street (1993–1999) and Augustus Haynes in The Wire (2008).

Early years
Johnson was born in Philadelphia, Pennsylvania. The family eventually moved to Canada. He has three siblings including jazz singer Molly Johnson and actress and singer Taborah Johnson.

Johnson attended Eastern Michigan University on a partial athletic scholarship for American football, but he was expelled after he was caught stealing food from the school cafeteria. He attended several other universities including the University of Ottawa and Loyola College/Concordia University, where he played Canadian football, before ending up at the Ontario College of Art as a film major. He was drafted by the Toronto Argonauts in the seventh round of the 1978 CFL Draft but ultimately did not play professionally.

Career
Johnson started in film doing special effects, including David Cronenberg's The Dead Zone. This behind-the-scenes work often served as a "backup" for him during the early stages of his acting career.

He began performing in feature films in 1981, landing roles in the films Killing 'em Softly, Colors, Wild Thing, Adventures in Babysitting, and Nowhere to Hide. He also acted in a number of television shows early in his career, including The Littlest Hobo, Night Heat, Hot Shots and E.N.G. He starred in the first episode of The Women of Brewster Place in 1989 as Butch Fuller.

Homicide: Life on the Street
In 1993, Johnson became part of the original cast of the television series Homicide: Life on the Street playing Detective Meldrick Lewis for all seven seasons and the reunion movie, as well as directing several episodes. Johnson regularly improvised during filming and made up his own jokes and dialogue; writer and producer James Yoshimura called Clark the "king of the ad lib". Although the ensemble nature of the show meant that Johnson never played a minor role, he became an even larger presence after his character was paired with a new partner, Mike Kellerman (played by Reed Diamond). The two detectives became the central figures in a plot line surrounding a Baltimore drug lord whose financial resources and front as a devoted community servant make it nearly impossible for the police department to charge him. Johnson made the transition to director with the season four episode "Map of the Heart". He also directed "Betrayal", "Valentine's Day", "Full Court Press" and "The Twenty Percent Solution". David Simon, the author of the non-fiction book Homicide was based upon, as well as a writer and producer for the series, commented that the transition from actor to director was made easy by Johnson's familiarity with the show and that he was one of the better directors in terms of keeping the tone of the show consistent. In 2013, Johnson made a brief cameo as Lewis in the Law & Order: Special Victims Unit episode "Wonderland Story" when the squad are at a retirement party for John Munch (Richard Belzer).

The Wire
Johnson worked on The Wire, reuniting with writer David Simon. Johnson directed the pilot episode "The Target", second episode, fifth episode and the series finale. He plays Augustus Haynes, the dedicated and principled editor for The Baltimore Sun city desk.

Alpha House
In 2013, Johnson starred as Sen. Robert Bettencourt (R-PA) in Amazon's Alpha House, a political comedy written by Doonesbury creator Garry Trudeau. Along with John Goodman, Johnson plays one of four Republican senators living together in a house on Capitol Hill. Johnson also directed the season finale for the show's first season. Johnson spent the summer of 2014 filming season two.

Directing
Johnson's other directing credits include the big-screen releases The Sentinel (2006) and S.W.A.T. (2003), and episodes of Third Watch as well as the HBO original production Boycott (2001), a project which he helmed and in which he also acted. He also directed the first episodes of Seasons 1 and 2 of the 2005 mini-series Sleeper Cell. He also directed the first and last episodes of The Shield, along with other episodes of that series.

Johnson directed the pilot episode of the FX drama Lights Out. The series stars fellow The Wire cast members Pablo Schreiber and Reg E. Cathey and focuses on a retired heavyweight boxing champion.

Johnson is a guest instructor at HB Studio.

Selected filmography

Actor
Night Heat TV series as David Jefferson (recurring) (1985–1988)
 Adventures in Babysitting (1987) as Black Gang Leader
 Iron Eagle II (1988) as Graves
 Renegades (1989) as J.J.
E.N.G. TV series as Clarke Roberts (1989–94)
 [[The Women of Brewster Place  (1989 TV Mini Series) as Butch Fuller
Hammerman as Hammerman (1991)
North of 60 as Sonny Ross (1993)
Homicide: Life on the Street TV series as Meldrick Lewis (1993–99)
Drop Zone (1994) as FBI Agent Bob Covington
Final Round (1994) as Trevon
Soul Survivor as Busha (1995)
The Planet of Junior Brown (1997)
Deliberate Intent (2000)
Homicide: The Movie as Meldrick Lewis (2000)
Love Come Down as Dean (2000)
S.W.A.T. as Deke's handsome partner (2003)
The Wire TV series as Gus Haynes (2008)
Nurse.Fighter.Boy as Silence (2008)
The Shield TV series as Handsome Marshal, Episode 7.13 "Family Meeting" (2008)
Defendor as Captain Fairbanks (2009)
Unforgettable TV series as Clay Jacobs, Episode "Blind Alleys" (2012)
Law & Order: Special Victims Unit TV series as Meldrick Lewis, Episode 15x05 "Wonderland Story" (2013)
Alpha House TV series as Senator Robert Bettencourt (2013–2014)
Bird People (2014) as McCullan
Hyena Road (2015) as General Rilmen
Magnum Opus as Robert Cochran (2017)
Brawl in Cell Block 99 as Detective Watkins (2017)
Bosch as Howard Elias (2018)
Seven Seconds as KJ's father (2018)
222 (Short) (completed) as The King of Hearts
Tammy's Always Dying (2019) as Doug
Evil (2019) as Father Amara

Director
Homicide: Life on the Street TV series (1996–98)
Episodes "Map of the Heart" (1996), "Betrayal" (1997), "Valentine's Day" (1997), "Full Court Press" (1998), "The Twenty Percent Solution" (1998)
Fast Track TV series (1997)
Welcome to Paradox TV series (1998)
La Femme Nikita TV series (1998)
Law & Order: Special Victims Unit TV series (1999)
Episode "Sophomore Jinx" (1999)
NYPD Blue TV series (2000)
Episode "Lucky Luciano" (2000)
The West Wing TV series (2000)
Episode "Six Meetings Before Lunch" (2000)
The Beat TV series (2000)
Third Watch TV series (2000)
Episode "Nature or Nurture?" (2000)
City of Angels TV series (2000)
The City TV series (2000)
Boycott (2001)
The Wire TV series (2002–08)
Episodes 1.01 "The Target", 1.02 "The Detail", 1.05 "The Pager" (2002); Episode 5.10 "–30–" (2008)
The Shield TV series (2002–08)
Episodes 1.01 "Pilot", 1.03 "The Spread", 1.05 "Blowback" (2002), 3.01 "Playing Tight", 3.02 "Blood and Water" (2004); 6.04 "The New Guy" (2007), 7.13 "Family Meeting" (2008)
S.W.A.T. (2003)
The Secret Service (2004)
The Jury (2004)
"Lamentation on the Reservation" (2004)
N.Y.-70 (2005)
Sleeper Cell TV series (2005–06)
Episode "Al-Faitha" (2005), "Al-Bagara" (2006)
The Sentinel (2006)
Memphis Beat TV series (2010–11)
Episode 1.01 "It's All Right Mama"
King TV series (2011)
Episodes 1.01 "Lori Gilbert", 1.02 "T-Bone"
Homeland TV series (2011)
Episodes 1.05 "Blind Spot", 1.11 "The Vest", 3.03 "Tower of David", 3.05 "The Yoga Play", 4.11 "Krieg Nicht Lieb"
The Walking Dead
Episode 2.08 "Nebraska"
Alpha House TV series (2013)
"In the Saddle" (2013)
Black Sails TV series (2015)
 Episodes "X" (2015), "XII" (2015)
American Odyssey TV series (2015)
 Episodes "Bug Out" (2015), "Real World" (2015)
 Hell on Wheels TV series (2014–2015)
 Episodes "Bear Man (2014), "Struck" (2015)
 Mad Dogs TV series (2016)
 Episode "Flares" (2016)
 Luke Cage TV series (2016)
 Episode "You Know My Steez" (2016)
 Shut Eye TV series (2016)
 Episode "The Tower - Reversed" (2016)
 Six TV miniseries (2017)
 Episode "Confession" (2017)
 Taken TV series (2017)
 Episode "A Clockwork Swiss" (2017)
 The Purge TV series (2018)
 Episode "Release The Beast" (2018)
 Juanita (2019)
 ‘’City on a Hill’’ TV series (2019-2021)
 Episode “High on the Looming Gallows Tree” (2019)
Episode "Apophasis" (2021)
Episode "Pax Bostonia" (2021)
 Percy (2020)
 Your Honor TV miniseries (2020)
 Part Four (2020)
 Mayor of Kingstown TV series (2021)
Episode: "Along Came a Spider"
Episode: "The Devil Is Us"
 Alaska Daily TV series (2022)
Episode: "It's Not Personal"
 Accused TV series (2023)
Episode: "Kendall's Story"

References

External links

2008 interview on Fresh Air

1954 births
Living people
Concordia University alumni
Male actors from Philadelphia
Black Canadian male actors
University of Ottawa alumni
20th-century Canadian male actors
21st-century Canadian male actors
American emigrants to Canada
American people of Trinidad and Tobago descent
Canadian people of African-American descent
Canadian people of Trinidad and Tobago descent
Canadian male film actors
Canadian male television actors
Film directors from Pennsylvania
Canadian television directors